Gerard P. Donelan (born 1949), known primarily as just Donelan, is an openly gay cartoonist. Part of the first wave of LGBT cartoonists, he drew "It's a Gay Life", a regular single-panel cartoon feature in The Advocate, for 15 years.

Personal life 
Donelan was born in Jamaica Plain, a neighborhood in Boston, but grew up in Plymouth, Massachusetts, the son of advertising artist Paul Donelan. He graduated from Plymouth Carver Regional High School in 1967. He studied art at Southeastern Massachusetts Technological Institute but did not finish a degree, and went to work in retail.

He met and began dating Christopher McKenna in May 1979. The couple chose to wait to be married until same-sex marriage was legalized nationally in 2015. After spending most of their lives together living in San Francisco, the couple eventually moved back to Donelan's hometown of Plymouth, Massachusetts after his mother Teresa passed away in 2004.

Career 
In 1977, disappointed that Joe Johnson's pioneering gay comic strips Miss Thing and Big Dick had ended their run in The Advocate, Donelan submitted 29 cartoons to the publication, which turned into a long-running series of his own. "It's a Gay Life" gently lampooned the gay "clone" culture of the time, also known as the Castro clone, focusing primarily on young and middle-aged gay men in their everyday lives. He continued to work in retail while producing the series, which also yielded two paperback reprints: Drawing on the Gay Experience (1987) and Donelan's Back (1988).

For eight years Donelan also created sexually explicit comics in color for Advocate Men, later retitled Men, which was an erotica sister publication of The Advocate. His work has appeared in Frontiers, Gunner, Gay Comix (including one front cover), and Meatmen (including two front covers and several back covers).

Donelan's art was produced in seven countries, including South Korea, and in five languages, including Dutch and Korean.  His work has appeared on t-shirts, rubber stamps, and in the National Baseball Hall of Fame in Cooperstown, New York. He has illustrated calendars and greeting cards as well.

Donelan created cartoons, pamphlets, and posters to educate the gay community about the importance of safe sex practices and the threat of AIDS. He did this work for the NAMES Project, which worked to honor victims of AIDS and AIDS-related diseases in an enormous patchwork quilt.

In May 2015, he was a featured panelist at the first Queers & Comics conference, as one of the "Pioneers of Queer Men's Comics".

Contributions 

 "Donelan" from Strip AIDS U.S.A.
"The Quilt" from Strip AIDS U.S.A.
cover of Gay Comix #7 (color credit to Robert Triptow)
"Night Moves" from Gay Comix #7
"The Discussion Group" from Gay Comix #7
"A Donelan Look at Women" from Gay Comix #10
"A Donelan Look at Men" from Gay Comix #10
"Blip..." from Gay Comix #25
untitled from No Straight Lines: Four Decades of Queer Comics
untitled from Meatmen #1
"Interrupted Transmission" from Meatmen #2
back cover from Meatmen #2
"It's a Gay Life" from The Advocate (active strip from 1977-1992)

Quotes

From the first Queers & Comics conference, on the panel for Pioneers of Queer Men's Comics 

“I always try to talk to younger gay people, to tell them what happened before … I think it’s important that we all understand what everybody else did before us so that they can appreciate what they have now.”

From Wicked Local article/interview with Emily Clark 

(speaking on the push for equality and acceptance) “We’re still not there, because not everybody agrees that you have a right to be who you are. We’re still the outliers – not part of the heterosexual community that everyone thinks is normal.”

From the Preface of Drawing on the Gay Experience 

"I loved recognizing little bits of real life in the black and white blocks of the daily papers. Hasn't everyone at one time had the urge to cut out a cartoon because 'That's me!'? That's what I wanted to do with my cartoons for the gay community. I wanted to do what Joe Johnson's 'Miss Thing' in the early days of The ADVOCATE had done for me when I was first coming out. I wanted some fairy to see one of my cartoons, say, 'That's me!' and realize that there are others who do what 'I' do, feel as 'I' feel. I wanted to help show other gay people that 'we' have a validity, a sense of humor and a sense of community. Why cartoons connect me to real life, I don't know. But I hope my cartoons connect my readers to our gay life in a positive way."

See also 

 LGBT themes in comics
List of comics creators
List of American comics creators

References

1949 births
Living people
American cartoonists
Artists from Boston
American LGBT artists
LGBT comics creators
LGBT people from Massachusetts
21st-century LGBT people